Ticket to Childhood (Vietnamese: Cho tôi xin một vé đi tuổi thơ, literally "Please Give me a ticket to Childhood") is a 2008 short story by Nguyễn Nhật Ánh. With this story; Nguyễn Nhật Ánh was awarded S.E.A. Write Award in 2010.

The English translation by William Naythons was published by The Overlook Press in 2014.

References

External links
Nguyễn Nhật Ánh with Cho tôi xin một vé đi tuổi thơ Children’s writer wins SEA Writer Award
Cho tôi xin một vé đi tuổi thơ (Special Edition) at Tre Publishing House

Short stories by Nguyễn Nhật Ánh
Vietnamese short stories
2008 short stories
The Overlook Press books